Stefan Horngacher (born 20 September 1969) is an Austrian ski jumping coach and former ski jumper. Since April 2019 he is coaching the German national team.

Career
Horngacher won a bronze medal in the team large hill at the Winter Olympics in both 1994 and 1998. He also competed at the 2002 Winter Olympics in Salt Lake City, with his best finish being fourth in the team large hill event. At the 1991 Ski Jumping World Championships, he won gold in the team large hill event and followed that with three bronzes over the next ten years (1993, 1999 and 2001); he also won gold in the 2001 team normal hill event.

After retiring from the sport, he became a ski jumping coach and has coached the national Polish team since 2016. 
2016–17 Four Hills Tournament, gold and silver
FIS Nordic World Ski Championships 2017 – Team large hill, gold
Coach of the year 2017 in Poland.
2017–18 Four Hills Tournament, gold and four consecutive wins

Since April 2019 he is coaching the German national team, succeeding Werner Schuster.

World Cup

Standings

Wins

References

External links
 
 

1969 births
Living people
Austrian male ski jumpers
Olympic ski jumpers of Austria
Olympic bronze medalists for Austria
Ski jumpers at the 1994 Winter Olympics
Ski jumpers at the 1998 Winter Olympics
Ski jumpers at the 2002 Winter Olympics
Austrian ski jumping coaches
Olympic medalists in ski jumping
FIS Nordic World Ski Championships medalists in ski jumping
Medalists at the 1998 Winter Olympics
Medalists at the 1994 Winter Olympics
People from Kufstein District
Sportspeople from Tyrol (state)
20th-century Austrian people